The Aga Khan Planning and Building Service (AKPBS) was established in 1980 as an agency of the Aga Khan Development Network (AKDN). The agency works to improve the built of environment, particularly housing design and construction, village planning, natural hazard mitigation, environmental sanitation, water supplies, and other living conditions. It does this by providing material, technical assistance and applied research, as well as planning and building management services for communities in both rural and urban areas.

Organization and governance
AKPBS acts through a series of national service companies that plan, organize, finance activities, operate facilities and program in close collaboration with other AKDN institutions, government, and select partner agencies. The national service companies are officially registered as not-for-profit, non-governmental organizations in each country. Their international sponsor is the Aga Khan Planning and Building Services S.A., a not-for-profit company based in Geneva, Switzerland. The Chairman and some or all of the directors of the AKPBS boards in India and Pakistan are appointed by the sponsoring company. All directors serve as volunteers on an unremunerated basis.

Improving safety standards
Community-based technical review services are provided by AKPBS to low-income families to help plan and construct multi-hazard resistant and affordable houses using appropriate technology, and alternative energy. Special attention is given to the preservation of traditional building technology which is re-engineered to improve safety standards and implemented through the capacity building of local skilled artisans.

Under disaster resilience programs, communities living in hazard-prone areas are being offered awareness programs, training, capacity building, and demonstrations of safe construction technologies.

National service companies
 The Aga Khan Planning and Building Service, Pakistan (AKPBS,P)
Was established in 1980 with a mandate to plan and implement infrastructure and technology-related development initiatives to improve living conditions within various provinces and regions, such as the Northern Areas of Pakistan, the Punjab, Khyber Pakhtunkhwa and Sindh in development program areas such as habitat risk reduction, energy efficient building and construction improvement, water supply and sanitation, and natural resource conservation.

AKPBS,P's main programs are the Water and Sanitation Extension Program (WASEP), the Building and Construction Improvement Program (BACIP) and the Habitat Risk Management Program (HRMP). These programs have been internationally recognized for their multi-beneficial impact, local community acceptance, and role in meeting the Millennium Development Goals.

 The Aga Khan Planning and Building Service, India (AKPBS,I)
Active since 1970, a major focus of their programs has been the installation of sanitation units in the villages of Gujarat state. AKPBS,I also assists communities with the improvement of village water systems, the construction of water harvesting systems, and water quality monitoring.

Making use of the experience in Pakistan and India, there are advanced plans for the establishment of AKPBS companies in both Afghanistan and Tajikistan.

See also
 Aga Khan Development Network
 Water and Sanitation Extension Program
 Building and Construction Improvement Program

References

Planning and Building Services
Construction and civil engineering companies of Pakistan
Construction and civil engineering companies of India
Real estate companies of Pakistan
Construction and civil engineering companies established in 1980
Pakistani companies established in 1980